The ninth series of Ballando con le Stelle was broadcast from October 5, 2013 to December, 2013 on RAI 1 and was presented by Milly Carlucci with Paolo Belli and his Big Band.

Couples

Scoring Chart

Red numbers indicate the lowest score for each week.
Green numbers indicate the highest score for each week.
 indicates the couple eliminated that week.
 indicates the returning couples that finished in the bottom two/three was saved by a second public vote.
 indicates the returning couple that finished in the bottom three/four and was saved by the judges.
 indicates the couple who quit the competition.
 indicates the couple was voted back into the competition.
 indicates the couple was voted back into the competition but then re-eliminated.
 indicates the couple passed to the next round automatically.
 indicates the winning couple.
 indicates the runner-up couple.
 indicates the third-place couple.

Highest and lowest scoring performances of the series 
The best and worst performances in each dance according to the judges' marks are as follows:

Average Chart

Dance order

Week 1 
Individual judges scores in charts below (given in parentheses) are listed in this order from left to right: Ivan Zazzaroni, Fabio Canino, Carolyn Smith, Rafel Amargo and Guillermo Mariotto.

09
2013 Italian television seasons